Şeyma Nur Emeksiz Bacaksız is  a Turkish Para Taekwondo practitioner. She obtained a quota for participation at the 2020 Summer Paralympics in Tokyo, Japan. She competed in the women's +58 kg event.

References

Living people
Paralympic taekwondo practitioners of Turkey
Turkish female taekwondo practitioners
Taekwondo practitioners at the 2020 Summer Paralympics
Year of birth missing (living people)
21st-century Turkish sportswomen